The 1978–79 OMJHL season was the fifth season of the Ontario Major Junior Hockey League (OMJHL). The Hamilton Fincups moved to Brantford, Ontario, becoming the Alexanders. Twelve teams each played 68 games. The Peterborough Petes won the J. Ross Robertson Cup, defeating the Niagara Falls Flyers.

League business
OMJHL commissioner Tubby Schmalz stated in July 1978, that the NHL–WHA merger would be the best situation for junior hockey. He hoped for government intervention to protect the Canadian Major Junior Hockey League after the results of an inquiry into junior hockey were made public. He stated that the National Hockey League had abided by verbal agreement not to sign junior players, but the World Hockey Association (WHA) continued to target juniors for talent, and referred to the recent signing of 16-year-old Wayne Gretzky to a contract. Schmalz contemplated legal action against Alan Eagleson and Birmingham Bulls owner John F. Bassett, for signing of junior-aged players under contract. Bassett felt that since players were 18 years old, they could be signed to a contract under Canadian laws. The lawsuit against Eagleson and the Birmingham Bulls was announced in September 1978, on behalf of the London Knights and the Sault Ste. Marie Greyhounds, and sued for "inducing breach of contract and wrongfully interfering with contractual relations".

In November 1978, the OMJHL transitioned from a part-time commissioner's role into a full-time position. Schmalz retired as of December 15, 1978, and was succeeded by Bill Beagan who had been commissioner of the International Hockey League. He took over a league whose teams were facing attendance and financial issues. He stated the targeting younger talent by the WHA was a threat to junior ice hockey, and sought to convince professional leagues that they are undermining their own future by signing players too young. In January 1979, Beagan felt the OMJHL would suffer from the Liquor Licence Board of Ontario ruling that breweries could no longer sponsor junior hockey, due to underage athletes on the teams. The OMJHL stood to lose $200,000 combined from Molson Brewery and the Labatt Brewing Company. Beagan petitioned the Government of Ontario to overturn the decision, stating the breweries had been good corporate citizens by supporting sports in Ontario.

Beagan's tenure with the OHL ended after 42 days, and he described his relationship in dealing with contract negotiations as "rocky". He stated, "They hired me to be captain. When I got there, I found out I was to be the second mate". The Canadian Press reported that Beagan claimed he resigned from the OMJHL, whereas the league stated was fired after six weeks on the job. A settlement was subsequently reached out of court. Sherwood Bassin from the Oshawa Generals was named the interim commissioner for the remainder of the season.

Regular season

Final standings
Note: GP = Games played; W = Wins; L = Losses; T = Ties; GF = Goals for; GA = Goals against; PTS = Points; x = clinched playoff berth; y = clinched first round bye; z = clinched division title & first round bye

Leyden Division

Emms Division

Scoring leaders

Playoffs

First round
Kitchener Rangers defeat Toronto Marlboros 3–0

Kingston Canadians defeat Ottawa 67's 3–1

Sudbury Wolves defeat Oshawa Generals 4–1

London Knights versus Windsor Spitfires (9 game series; series protested and both teams move on to next round)

Niagara Falls Flyers defeat Kitchener Rangers 4–3

Leyden division quarterfinals
Peterborough Petes defeat Kingston Canadians 4–2, 1 tie

Semifinals
Peterborough Petes defeat Sudbury Wolves 4–1

Niagara Falls Flyers (5-1-0) defeat Windsor Spitfires (2-3-1) and London Knights (1-4-1) in round-robin

J. Ross Robertson Cup
Peterborough Petes defeat Niagara Falls Flyers 4–3

Awards

See also
List of OHA Junior A standings
List of OHL seasons
1979 Memorial Cup
1979 NHL Entry Draft
1978 in sports
1979 in sports

References

External links
HockeyDB

Ontario Hockey League seasons
OMJHL